Esmeralda may refer to:

Places
 Esmeralda, Queensland, a locality in the Shire of Croydon, Australia
 Esmeralda Municipality, Oruro Department, Bolivia
 Esmeralda, Rio Grande do Sul, a municipality in Brazil
 Esmeralda, a town in Chile
 Esmeralda Island, Chile
 Esmeralda, Cuba
 Esmeralda County, Nevada, United States

Arts and entertainment

The Hunchback of Notre Dame
 Esmeralda (The Hunchback of Notre-Dame), a character in Victor Hugo's novel and its adaptations
 Esmeralda (opera), an 1883 English opera by Arthur Goring Thomas
 La Esmeralda (opera), a 1836 French opera by Louise Bertin
 La Esmeralda (ballet), an 1844 ballet
 Esmeralda (Dargomyzhsky), an 1847 opera by Alexander Dargomyzhsky
 Esmeralda (1905 film), a French short silent film
 Esmeralda (1922 film), a British silent film

Television
 Esmeralda (Mexican TV series), a telenovela on El Canal de las Estrellas
 Esmeralda (Venezuelan TV series), a program broadcast by Venevisión
 Esmeralda (Brazilian TV series), a program on Sistema Brasileiro de Televisão
 Maggie Esmerelda, a character from American Horror Story: Freak Show
 Esmeralda, a character from Bewitched
 Esmeralda (Cro character)
 Esmeralda, a secondary villain in the anime Saint October

Other arts and entertainment
 Esmeralda (1915 film), a film based on an 1880s play of the same name
 Esmeralda (Fur Fighters), a character from the Fur Fighters video game
 Esmeralda, a character from the 1947 novel Doctor Faustus by Thomas Mann
 Esmerelda Weatherwax, a Discworld character
 Esmeralda, servant of Tarzan in Tarzan of the Apes
 "Esmeralda", a poem by Nikos Kavvadias
 Esmeralda, a seal in the 1954 film 20,000 Leagues Under the Sea

Ships
 , a Portuguese carrack which sank in 1503, the earliest ship found to date from Europe’s Age of Discovery
 , a Spanish frigate captured by Chile in 1820
 , a steam corvette of the Chilean Navy, sunk during the War of the Pacific
 , a steamboat on the Colorado River
 , the world's first protected cruiser
 , an armored cruiser
 Esmeralda (1944), ex-, a corvette transferred to the Chilean Navy
 , a training ship of the Chilean Navy, launched in 1953

Other uses
 Esmeralda (given name)
 Esmeralda (plant), a genus of orchids
 Esmeralda (beetle), a genus of beetles
 Esmeralda (Mexibús), a BRT station in Ecatepec de Morelos, Mexico
 Esmeralda Avenue (disambiguation)
 Esmeralda Open, a golf tournament on the PGA Tour that was played in the 1940s
 Escuela Nacional de Pintura, Escultura y Grabado "La Esmeralda", an educational institution for plastic arts
 Esmeralda language, an extinct language from Ecuador
 Esmeralda Peaks, a mountain in Washington state, United States

See also
 Santa Esmeralda, a 1970s musical group
 Miss Esmeralda, an 1887 Victorian burlesque on Victor Hugo's work, with music by Meyer Lutz and a libretto by Fred Leslie
 La Esmeralda (disambiguation)
 Esmeraldas (disambiguation)